Club Sportiv Comunal 1599 Șelimbăr, commonly known as 1599 Șelimbăr or simply as Șelimbăr, is a Romanian football club based in Șelimbăr, Sibiu County, currently playing in the Liga II. 1599 Șelimbăr was founded in 2016, under the name of Viitorul Șelimbăr in order to continue the football tradition in the commune, after the dissolution of the old team, Sevișul Șelimbăr.

History
CSC 1599 Șelimbăr was founded in 2016, under the name of Viitorul Șelimbăr, by a group of youngsters from the commune, coordinated by Nicolae Preuteasa, in order to continue the football tradition in Șelimbăr after the dissolution of the old team, Sevișul Șelimbăr. The senior squad was enrolled directly in the Liga IV, Sibiu County Series being ranked 6th (2016–17) and 2nd (2017–18), before finishing 1st and to have the chance to play a promotion play-off match.

In the promotion play-off, Șelimbărenii passed of CS Gheorgheni (Harghita County champions), 5–3 on aggregate and promoted for the first time in their history to Liga III, but also at six years after the relegation of Sevișul from this tier.

After two seasons in the third tier, Viitorul Șelimbăr promoted in the Liga II, under the command of Florin Maxim. Viitorul is the first team from Șelimbăr that achieved this performance, in the history of the commune from Sibiu County. In the same summer Viitorul Șelimbăr was renamed as CSC 1599 Șelimbăr.

Grounds

1599 Șelimbăr plays its home matches on Comunal Stadium in Șelimbăr, Sibiu County, with a capacity of 1,000 seats. Starting with the spring of 2019, the club moved on Măgura Stadium in Cisnădie, with a capacity of 5,000 seats, due to the renovation and expansion works that started at their own stadium. In the summer of 2020, Șelimbăr moved again, this time at Avrig, on the Central Stadium.

Honours
Liga III:
Winners (1): 2020–21

Liga IV – Sibiu County:
Winners (1): 2018–19
Runners-up (1): 2017–18

Cupa României – Sibiu County:
Winners (1): 2017–18
Runners-up (1): 2018–19

Players

First team squad

Out on loan

Club officials

Board of directors

Current technical staff

League history

References

External links
 
 

Association football clubs established in 2016
Football clubs in Sibiu County
Liga II clubs
Liga III clubs
Liga IV clubs
2016 establishments in Romania